The First Matsukata Cabinet is the fourth Cabinet of Japan led by Matsukata Masayoshi from May 6, 1891, to August 8, 1892.

Cabinet

References 

Cabinet of Japan
1891 establishments in Japan
Cabinets established in 1891
Cabinets disestablished in 1892